Binnya E Law (1308–1348/49) was king of Martaban from 1330 to 1348. Placed on the throne by his half-sister Queen Sanda Min Hla, this son of King Hkun Law defeated Sukhothai's invasion in 1330–1331, ending Martaban's tributary status to the Siamese kingdom.

The rest of his reign was largely uneventful except for the fierce rivalry between E Law's son Binnya E Laung and Sanda Min Hla's son Binnya U. The king died soon after his son's death, and was succeeded by Binnya U.

Early life
Binnya E Law was a son of King Hkun Law, and a nephew of King Wareru, the dynasty's founder. He was born on 13 March 1308. E Law only three years old in March 1311 when his father was assassinated in a coup organized by his aunt Princess Hnin U Yaing and her husband Gov. Min Bala of Myaungmya. The couple placed their eldest son Saw O (r. 1311–1323) on the throne but spared the children of Hkun Law. E Law had two half-sisters Sanda Min Hla and Tala Shin Saw Bok.

In the following years, E Law kept a low profile, and gained the trust of O's successor King Saw Zein (r. 1323–1330). Zein, who was E Law's first cousin and brother-in-law, first appointed E Law as governor of Sittaung and later governor of Pegu (Bago) by the late 1320s.

Reign

Accession
In 1330, E Law unexpectedly became king of Martaban. Circa April of that year, King Saw Zein was assassinated by Zein Pun, one of his senior officers. The king's chief queen Sanda Min Hla staged a counter coup a week later, and had the usurper executed. Queen Sanda then placed Saw E, son of King Saw O, on the throne, and made herself his chief queen. But the 16-year-old king quickly ran afoul of the powerful queen, and was poisoned 49 days later and died.

Queen Sanda now summoned her half-brother E Law to take over the throne. The chronicle Razadarit Ayedawbon relates that E Law was wary of his sister, and reluctantly came to Martaban (Mottama) by ship. He did not bring any of his concubines, and brought only his son Binnya E Laung. At Martaban, he was consecrated king with Sanda Min Hla as his chief queen. The 22-year-old king also raised his other half-sister Tala Shin Saw Bok (Sanda Min Hla's younger sister) as queen. It was  June 1330.

War with Sukhothai
E Law's immediate task was to contain the fallout from E's assassination. King Loe Thai of Sukhothai was greatly angered by the assassination of his grandson, and considered the brief truce achieved during E's short reign null and void. (Prior to E's restoration of ties, Martaban had been at war with its erstwhile overlord throughout the 1320s over the control of the Tenasserim coast. While Martaban took the coast down to the Tenasserim town in 1321, Sukhothai had been on the offensive since the mid-1320s, and retaken the coast up to Tavoy (Dawei) by 1330.) Martaban fully expected an invasion after the rainy season. The regime ordered defensive preparations along the expected invasion route: Sittaung, Donwun and Martaban.

Preparations paid off. According to the Razadarit, when four Sukhothai regiments invaded along the expected route, they faced heavy resistance from Martanban defenses. Although Sukhothai troops eventually took Sittaung and Donwun, they were a spent force by then. Nonetheless, the depleted invasion army decided to march on to Martaban. It turned out to be a bad decision. The outnumbered invaders were decisively defeated en route by two Martaban armies consisted of nine regiments. E Law personally commanded one of the two armies. Only a few invaders escaped the carnage. So decisive was the defeat that Sukhothai would not send another invasion force. At any rate, Sukhothai and its successor Ayutthaya continued to claim Martaban and Moulmein as its possessions.

Post-war period
The war with Sukhothai was costly. The fighting had destroyed the farms and able men throughout the region, and the country faced a famine. So chaotic were the conditions that one of the northern Burmese-speaking states may have raided Pegu. But Upper Burma itself was divided into multiple power centers, and was in no position to pose an existential threat to E Law's Mon-speaking fully independent kingdom.

The rest of E Law's reign was largely non-eventful. He may still have ruled in the shadow of Sanda Min Hla. He did not designate his only son E Laung heir-apparent as Sanda Min Hla's only son Binnya U also eyed the throne. The rivalry between the princes escalated in the 1340s when E Laung's health declined. The princes ended up fighting each other in an elephant-back duel in which U defeated E Laung. The king was furious, and had U arrested. But he released U at the request of Sanda Min Hla and Tala Shin Saw Bok. His son died from smallpox soon after.

Death
The king died at age 40 in 1348/49 (or 44 in 1353/54). He was succeeded by Binnya U.

Notes

References

Bibliography
 
 
 
 
 

Hanthawaddy dynasty
1340s deaths
1308 births
14th-century Burmese monarchs